John Allen Clements is a physician known for his role in the study of pulmonary surfactant. He graduated from Weill Cornell Medical College in 1947. He is a professor at University of California, San Francisco.

Awards 
1983 Gairdner Foundation International Award
1994 Lasker-DeBakey Clinical Medical Research Award
2008 Pollin Prize for Pediatric Research

References 

Weill Cornell Medical College alumni
American pulmonologists
Living people
Year of birth missing (living people)
University of California, San Francisco faculty
Scientists from the San Francisco Bay Area
Recipients of the Lasker-DeBakey Clinical Medical Research Award